The Leipzig Meuten (from Meuten meaning "packs, gangs") were anti-Nazi gangs of children, teenagers and young adults based in Leipzig during the Nazi period of Germany, who aimed to destroy Nazi control. They were similar to the Edelweiss Pirates, but more politically driven.

Background 
The Meuten became active in Leipzig around 1937, and such as members of Blasen they were blue collar workers, apprentices and shop clerks. When they were not congregating in cinemas, public swimming pools, or formerly Communist neighborhood pubs, they liked to hike and discuss politics. There are reports of the Meuten in Dresden and other Saxon towns, but the records of the activity is incredibly scarce.

Members 
Members came from working-class families and borrowed from socialist and communist traditions. Between 1937 and 1939, the Meuten had, according to the Gestapo, an estimated 1500 members.

Clothing 
The group wore motley clothes, with the males wearing plaid shirts, white socks and lederhosen in the summer, and slalom shirts and ski pants in the winter. Females wore long blue skirts of the traditional youth movement. Red kerchiefs were used as pro-left sympathies were also seen in the group.

Communist leanings 
The group had Communist roots and listened to Radio Moscow and stretched the customary bündisch bias for everything Russian, while romanticizing the conditions in the Soviet Union. The group also used a vulgarized Russian greeting of "bud cadoff" instead of "Heil Hitler." 

The group held strong SPD and KPD roots.

Nazi reaction 
They were dealt with ruthlessly by the Nazis. 
 
A group of members were convicted in October 1938 and sentenced to between one and five years of incarceration, due to the Meuten being connected to Communism and at the time Germany held legislation that forbade the resurrection of any of the Weimar political parties.

Memorials 
There is a permanent exhibition commemorating them at the Leipzig School Museum. The group is also included in the Memorial to the German Resistance in Berlin, Germany.

References

World War II resistance movements
German resistance to Nazism
History of subcultures
German Youth Movement
Political youth organisations in Germany
History of Leipzig